The European Federation for Transport and Environment, commonly referred to as Transport & Environment (T&E), is a European umbrella for non-governmental organisations working in the field of transport and the environment, promoting sustainable transport in Europe; which means an approach to transport that is environmentally responsible, economically sound and socially just.

History 
Since it was founded 30 years ago, T&E has shaped some of Europe's most important environmental laws. It played a key role in getting the EU to set the world's most ambitious  standards for cars and trucks and also helped uncover the dieselgate scandal; it campaigned successfully to end palm oil diesel; secured a global ban on dirty shipping fuels and the creation of the world's biggest carbon market for aviation, to name a few. In 2020 T&E's campaigning led Uber to commit to electrifying much of its European operations.

T&E's research findings are regularly cited in major publications across the world including the Financial Times, the Guardian, Politico, Le Monde, France Info, Spiegel, Die Zeit, El País, Corriere della Sera, Gazeta Wyborcza, New York Times and many more.

Mission 
Transport & Environment's (T&E) vision is a zero-emission mobility system that is affordable and has minimal impacts on our health, climate and environment. It is a non-profit organisation and politically independent that combines the power of robust, science-based evidence and a deep understanding of transport with memorable communications and impactful advocacy.

Publications 

T&E is renowned for its thorough and targeted publications. Some of the highlights include:

Lifecycle analysis 
This tool compiles all the most up-to-date data on  emissions linked to the use of an electric, diesel or petrol car, to show how much  electric cars can really save compared to diesel and petrol cars.

BloombergNEF study 
A BloombergNEF study, commissioned by Transport & Environment (T&E), found that electric cars and vans will be cheaper to make than fossil-fuel vehicles in every light vehicle segment across Europe from 2027 at the latest. The research found that battery electric vehicles could reach 100% of new sales across the EU by 2035, if lawmakers introduce measures like tighter vehicle  targets and strong support for charging infrastructure. T&E called on the EU to tighten emissions targets in the 2020s and set 2035 as the end date for selling new polluting vehicles.

Biofuels 
T&E has published a number of reports exposing the true cost of the EU's disastrous biofuels policy which is responsible for widespread deforestation and habitat loss.

Private Jets 
T&E's report exposed the outsized role played by the super rich hopping on private jets for short distances.

Cruise ship report 
T&E's research  into cruise ship operators found that Carnival Corporation, the world's largest luxury cruise operator, emitted nearly 10 times more sulphur oxide around European coasts thanall 260 million European cars in 2017, while Royal Caribbean Cruises, the world's second largest, was second, four times worse than the European car fleet. The report also exposed  emissions which increase human health risks and contribute to acidification in terrestrial and aquatic environments.

EV market report 
T&E's yearly EV market report report sheds light on the effect car  targets have on the production of zero-emission vehicles.

Main campaign areas 
Air pollution
Aviation
Better trade and regulation
Biofuels
Cars and 
Cleaner, safer trucks
Dieselgate: Testing reform
Dirty oil
Effort sharing regulation
EU Transport Policy
Rail
Shipping
Vans
Vehicle noise

Members 
T&E is currently supported by 73 organisations (63 members and 10 supporters) in 24 countries.

Funding 
Transport & Environment receives funding from: European Climate Foundation, The Norwegian Agency for Development Cooperation, Climate Imperative Foundation, the European Commission, ClimateWorks Foundation, Schwab Charitable Fund, Oak Foundation and a number of other high-profile institutions and organisations.

See also 
 Climate change in the European Union
 Electric vehicles
 European emission standards
 Transport in Europe

References

External links
T&E's homepage

European Union and the environment
Transport organizations based in Europe
Climate change in the European Union
International organisations based in Belgium